Isanotski Peaks or Isanotski Volcano, known locally as "Ragged Jack", is a multipeaked mountain on Unimak Island, the easternmost Aleutian Island in Alaska, United States. It is an old, highly dissected stratovolcano, lying about 10 miles (16 km) east of Shishaldin Volcano, the highest peak in the Aleutian Islands. Its height is also often given as 8,025 feet (2446 m).

In contrast to many of the younger, symmetrical volcanoes of the region, Isanotski is topped by multiple rugged pinnacles. This makes climbing or skiing the peak much more challenging than Shishaldin, for example.

While eruptions from 1825 and the 1840s have been attributed to Isanotski, geologists were only able to find evidence of Holocene eruptions on Shishaldin, not on Isanotski. Because of this, the actual date of Isanotski's last eruption is unknown.


See also

List of mountain peaks of North America
List of mountain peaks of the United States
List of mountain peaks of Alaska
List of Ultras of the United States
List of volcanoes in the United States

References

 
 Michael Wood and Colby Coombs, Alaska: a climbing guide, The Mountaineers, 2001.

External links

 Isanotski Peaks on skimountaineer.com
 Isanotski Peaks on Topozone

Volcanoes of Aleutians East Borough, Alaska
Mountains of Aleutians East Borough, Alaska
Mountains of Alaska
Volcanoes of Alaska
Stratovolcanoes of the United States
Aleutian Range
Unimak Island
Pleistocene stratovolcanoes